Qaraqaya or Qaragaya may refer to:
Qaraqaya, Ismailli, Azerbaijan
Qaraqaya, Yardymli, Azerbaijan